Rhymney Bridge railway station was a station on the London and North Western Railway's Heads of the Valleys line serving the village of Llechrhyd in the Welsh county of Glamorganshire.

History
The line was leased and operated by the London and North Western Railway (L&NWR) which acquired the smaller railway company on 30 June 1866. The joint line came into operation on 5 September 1871 when the junction was opened; the L&NWR had running powers over the Rhymney's line to Cardiff Docks.

The station, which was at first known as Rumney Bridge, opened to Rhymney services on 2 October 1871 and to L&NWR services on 1 January 1873. It took its name from the bridge over the River Rhymney which was situated a short distance to the south-east; the nearest settlement was the village of Llechrhyd. The station had three platform faces and, as with the junction at Nantybwch, the signal box stood in the "V" of an island platform. The two platforms serving the Abergavenny and Merthyr line had no passenger accommodation, although a brick station building stood on the Merthyr platform. This structure has been described as "resembling a peasant's dwelling from the bleak wastes of northern China". Rhymney Bridge itself was situated in a desolate location, with scant protection from the inclement weather provided by a weather-boarded footbridge linking the platforms. The Rhymney branch platform was situated at a lower level to the main line platforms and was skirted by two goods loops which were useful for slow-moving goods trains.

As a result of decline in the local industry and the costs of working the line between Abergavenny and Merthyr, passenger services ended on 4 January 1958. Services on the Rhymney branch had ceased on 23 September 1953 and goods facilities were withdrawn from Rhymney Bridge on 22 November 1954. The last public service over the Merthyr line was an SLS railtour on 5 January 1958 hauled by LNWR 0-8-0 49121 and L&NWR Coal Tank No. 58926]]. At Rhymney Bridge, a laurel wreath was placed on the smokebox door of No. 58926. Official closure came on 6 January.

Present
The site of the station has been lost under the A465 road. The branch to Rhymney has been obliterated by the A469 road.

References

Notes

Sources

Disused railway stations in Caerphilly County Borough
Former London and North Western Railway stations
Former Rhymney Railway stations
Railway stations in Great Britain opened in 1871
Railway stations in Great Britain closed in 1958
1871 establishments in Wales
1958 disestablishments in Wales